The name Laura has been used for a total of five tropical cyclones worldwide:

In the North Atlantic:
 Tropical Storm Laura (1971) – a system that formed off Panama, looped south of western Cuba, and landed in southern Belize
 Tropical Storm Laura (2008) – a large but short-lived system that remained in the open ocean
 Hurricane Laura (2020) – developed in the Caribbean Sea before growing into a powerful Category 4 hurricane in the Gulf of Mexico before making landfall in Louisiana

The name was retired from use in the Atlantic basin after 2020, and will be replaced by Leah in the 2026 season.

In the Western Pacific:
 Typhoon Laura (1947) (T4710)

In the Southern Indian Ocean: 
 Cyclone Laura (1967)

See also 

 Hurricane Laurie (1969) – a similar name that was used once in the Atlantic

Atlantic hurricane set index articles
Pacific typhoon set index articles
Australian region cyclone set index articles